SS Westfalen was a German ship launched on 14 November 1905 at Joh. C. Tecklenborg in Geestemünde (today Bremerhaven).

In the early 1930s Westfalen was converted into a seaplane tender to serve as a weather reporting and refueling station for Dornier Wal flying boats of Deutsche Luft Hansa carrying mail across the Atlantic between Europe and South America.  The conversion of the Westfalen consisted of a large retractable stern mounted canvas drag apron for the flying boat to taxi on (i.e. for use in heavy seas and so the ship did not have to come to dead stop), cranes to lift the flying boats out of the water to be refueled and serviced, and a large compressed air catapult for launching the aircraft.  When in operation, Westfalen cruised 900 miles in the middle of the South Atlantic between Bathhurst, Gambia (now Banjul) and Pernambuco, Brazil.  The first test trans-Atlantic flights by Lufthansa Wals began in 1933 and the first commercial mail flights in 1934.

World War II
During World War II, the ship was used for transport between Germany and German-occupied Norway. On 28 July 1943, Westfalen sailed from Bodø under escort of the vorpostenboot  for a port to the south. On 7 September 1944 the ship sank off Marstrand, after hitting a naval mine. Seventy-eight people aboard survived, but most of the locked-up Norwegian prisoners-of-war were casualties, including Petter Moen, Reidar Olaf Østlid and Sverre Lid. SS-Sturmscharführer Wilhelm Heinze also died.

References

Bibliography

External links
 "Steamer Is Floating Airport For Flying Boats" May 1933 Popular Mechanics
 SS Westfalen (+1944) Wreck site

1905 ships
Ships built in Bremen (state)
Steamships of Germany
Merchant ships of Germany
World War II merchant ships of Germany
Ships sunk by mines
Shipwrecks of Sweden
World War II shipwrecks in the North Sea
Maritime incidents in September 1944
1944 in Norway
Seaplane tenders